Folks & Tales is an album of folk songs from around the world by the German vocal group Amarcord Ensemble. It was released in 2013 on Raumklang.

Track list
Es klappert die Mühle am rauschenden Bach (de)
Nine hundred miles away from home
No poth reposare
Smedsvisa
The Last Rose of Summer
Waltzing Matilda – Australia
Arirang – Korea
Pen-pen de Sarapen – Tagalog song
Da N'ase – Ghana
Cockles and Mussels
Habanera Tú
Sakura Sakura
Lom Nao (ລົມໜາວ) – Lao "wind of winter"
Wa Kusnitze (Во кузнице) – Russia
Červená Růžičko – Czech
Hava Nagila – Hebrew
Pūt, Vējiņi (lv) – Latvia "Blow Ye Wind!"

References

2013 classical albums